De Colección is the second hits album by iconic Mexican pop singer Verónica Castro. It was released in 1996.

Track listing

 "La Movida" 
 "Mi Pequeña Soledad" 
 "Chiquita Pero Picosa" 
 "Que Se Vaya a la Parranda" 
 "Furia Musical (Vamonos Al Dancing)" 
 "Era Chiquito" 
 "Gallo Tuerto" 
 "Nana Pancha" 
 "Copa Tras Copa" 
 "El Quebradito" 
 "Una Miradita" 
 "Muchas Millas Recorridas"

1996 compilation albums
Verónica Castro albums